A covert listening device, more commonly known as a bug or a wire, is usually a combination of a miniature radio transmitter with a microphone. The use of bugs, called bugging, or wiretapping is a common technique in surveillance, espionage and police investigations.

Self-contained electronic covert listening devices came into common use with intelligence agencies in the 1950s, when technology allowed for a suitable transmitter to be built into a relatively small package. By 1956, the US Central Intelligence Agency was designing and building "Surveillance Transmitters" that employed transistors, which greatly reduced the size and power consumption. An all solid-state device had low enough power needs that it could be operated by small batteries, which revolutionized the business of covert listening.

A bug does not have to be a device specifically designed for the purpose of eavesdropping. For instance, with the right equipment, it is possible to remotely activate the microphone of cellular phones, even when a call is not being made, to listen to conversations in the vicinity of the phone.

Dictograph 
Among the earliest covert listening devices used in the United States of America was the dictograph, an invention of Kelley M. Turner patented in 1906 (US Patent US843186A). It consisted of a microphone in one location and a remote listening post with a speaker that could also be recorded using a phonograph. While also marketed as a device that allowed broadcasting of sounds, or dictating text from one room to a typist in another, it was used in several criminal investigations.

A wire 
A "wire" is a device that is hidden or concealed under a person's clothes for the purpose of covertly listening to conversations in proximity to the person wearing the "wire". Wires are typically used in police sting operations in order to gather information about suspects.

The act of "wearing a wire" refers to a person knowingly recording the conversation or transmitting the contents of a conversation to a police listening post. Usually, some sort of device is attached to the body in an inconspicuous way, such as taping a microphone wire to their chest. Undercover agents "wearing a wire" is a typical plot element in gangster and police-related movies and television shows. A stereotypical scene might include an individual being suspected by criminals of "wearing a wire", resulting in their tearing the suspect's shirt open to reveal the deception.

When infiltrating a criminal organization a mole may be given a "wire" to wear under their clothes.
The wire device transmits to a remote location where law enforcement agents monitor what is being said. Wearing a wire is viewed as risky since discovery could lead to violence against the mole or other retaliatory responses.

Remotely activated mobile phone microphones 
Mobile phone (cell phone) microphones can be activated remotely, without any need for physical access. This "roving bug" feature has been used by law enforcement agencies and intelligence services to listen in on nearby conversations. A United States court ruled in 1988 that a similar technique used by the FBI against reputed former Gulfport, Mississippi, cocaine dealers after having obtained a court order was permissible. Not only microphones but also seemingly innocuous motion sensors, which can be accessed by third-party apps on Android and iOS devices without any notification to the user, are a potential eavesdropping channel in smartphones.

Automobile computer systems

In 2003, the FBI obtained a court order to surreptitiously listen in on conversations in a car through the car's built-in emergency and tracking security system. A panel of the 9th Circuit Court of Appeals prohibited the use of this technique because it involved deactivating the device's security features.

Audio from optical sources

A laser microphone can be used to reconstruct audio from a laser beam shot onto an object in a room, or a window.

Researchers have also prototyped a method for reconstructing audio from video of thin objects that can pick up sound vibrations, such as a houseplant or bag of potato chips.

Examples of use
 Embassies and other diplomatic posts are often the targets of bugging operations.
 The Soviet embassy in Ottawa was bugged by the Government of Canada and MI5 during its construction in 1956.
 The Russian Embassy in The Hague was bugged by the BVD and the CIA in 1958 and 1959 using an Easy Chair Mark III listening device.
 Extensive bugging of the West German embassy in Moscow by the KGB was discovered by German engineer Horst Schwirkmann, leading to an attack on Schwirkmann in 1964.
 The Great Seal bug was hidden in a copy of the Great Seal of the United States, presented by the Soviet Union to the United States ambassador in Moscow in 1946 and only discovered in 1952. The bug was unusual in that it had no power source or active components, making it much harder to detect—it was a new type of device, called a passive resonant cavity bug. The cavity had a metallic diaphragm that moved in unison with sound waves from a conversation in the room. When illuminated by a radio beam from a remote location, the cavity would return a frequency modulated signal.
 The United States Embassy in Moscow was bugged during its construction in the 1970s by Soviet agents posing as laborers. When discovered in the early 1980s, it was found that even the concrete columns were so riddled with bugs that the building eventually had to be torn down and replaced with a new one, built with US materials and labor.
 In 1984, bugs were discovered in at least 16 IBM Selectric typewriters in the US Embassy in Moscow and the US Consulate in Leningrad. The highly sophisticated devices were planted by the Soviets between 1976 and 1984, and were hidden inside a metal support bar. Information was intercepted by detecting the movements of metal bars inside the typewriter (the so-called latch interposers) by means of magnetometers. The data was then compressed and transmitted in bursts.
 In 1990, it was reported that the embassy of the People's Republic of China in Canberra, Australia, had been bugged by the Australian Secret Intelligence Service as part of the UKUSA Project Echelon.
 In 2003, the Pakistani embassy building in London was found bugged; contractors hired by MI5 had planted bugs in the building in 2001.
 During World War II, the Nazis took over a Berlin brothel, Salon Kitty, and used concealed microphones to spy on patrons.
 Also during the war, the British used covert listening devices to monitor captured German fighter pilots being held at Trent Park.
 In the late 1970s, a bug was discovered in a meeting room at the OPEC headquarters in Vienna. The bug intercepted the audio from the PA system via a pickup coil and transmitted it on a frequency near 600 MHz using subcarrier audio masking. It was not discovered who was responsible for planting the bug.
 Colin Thatcher, a Canadian politician, was secretly recorded making statements which would later be used to convict him of his wife's murder. The recording device was concealed on a person Thatcher had previously approached for help in the crime.
 Electronic bugging devices were found in March 2003 at offices used by French and German delegations at the European Union headquarters in Brussels. Devices were also discovered at offices used by other delegations. The discovery of the telephone tapping systems was first reported by Le Figaro newspaper, which blamed the US.
 The car of Thomas Hentschell, who was involved in the Melbourne gangland killings, was bugged by police.
 In 1999, the US expelled a Russian diplomat, accusing him of using a listening device in a top floor conference room used by diplomats in the United States Department of State headquarters.
 In 2001, the government of the People's Republic of China announced that it had discovered twenty-seven bugs in a Boeing 767 purchased as an official aircraft of the General Secretary of the Chinese Communist Party, Jiang Zemin.
 In 2003, Alastair Campbell (who was Director of Communications and Strategy from 1997 to 2003 for the British Prime Minister) in his memoirs The Blair Years: The Alastair Campbell Diaries alleged that two bugs were discovered in the hotel room meant for visiting Prime Minister Tony Blair planted by Indian intelligence agencies. The alleged bug discovery was at a hotel during Blair's official visit to New Delhi in 2001. Security services supposedly informed him that the bugs could not be removed without drilling the wall and therefore he changed to another room.
 In 2004, a bug was found in a meeting room at the United Nations offices in Geneva.
 In 2008, it was reported that an electric samovar presented to Elizabeth II in about 1968 by a Soviet aerobatic team was removed from Balmoral Castle as a security precaution amid fears that its wiring could contain a listening device.
 On 6 December 1972, the Central Intelligence Agency placed a wire tap on a multiplex trunk line 24 kilometers southwest of Vinh to intercept Vietnamese communist messages concerning negotiating an end to the Vietnam War.
 The Watergate scandal in the 1970s.

Listening devices and the UK law 

The use of listening devices is permitted under UK law providing that they are used in compliance with Data Protection and Human Rights laws. If a government body or organisation intends to use listening or recording devices they must follow the laws put in place by the Regulation of Investigatory Powers Act (RIPA). It is usually permitted to record audio covertly in a public setting or one's own home.

Legal requirements of listening and recording device use 
It is illegal to use listening or recording devices that are not permitted for public use. Individuals may only use listening or recording devices within reasonable privacy laws for legitimate security and safety reasons. Many people use listening devices in their own property to capture evidence of excessive noise in a neighbour complaint, which is legal in normal circumstances.

Legal use of listening and recording devices 
It is legal to use listening or recording devices in public areas, in an office or business area, or in one's own home. Many people use listening devices to record evidence or to take notes for their own reference.

Illegal use of listening and recording devices 
It is illegal to use listening devices on certain Military band and Air Band UHF and FM frequencies - people in the past who have not followed this law have been fined over £10,000. This is because the use of a radio transmission bug that transmits on restricted frequencies contravenes the Telecommunications Act and is illegal. It is also against the law to place a listening or recording device in someone else's home. Due to privacy and human rights laws, using a listening or recording device to intrude on the reasonable expectation of privacy of an individual is highly illegal, i.e. placing gadgets in someone's home or car to which one does not have permitted access, or in a private area such as a bathroom.

See also

 Acoustic cryptanalysis
 Cellphone surveillance
 Communications interception
 Eavesdropping
 Electronic Privacy Information Center
 Espionage
 Greek telephone tapping case 2004-2005
 Mobile phone tracking
 National Cryptologic Museum
 Nonlinear junction detector
 Peter Wright
 Privacy
 Privacy International
 Surveillance
 Technical surveillance counter-measures
 Telephone tapping
 TEMPEST
 
 Watergate scandal

References

External links 
 French, German EU Offices Bugged - CBS news story
 EU investigates mystery buggings - BBC News story
 A simple guide to TSCM, How to protect privacy
 "Listening In: Electronic Eavesdropping in the Cold War Era". US Department of State, Bureau of Diplomatic Security, 2008
 "Bugging Hotel Rooms". US Department of Agriculture.
 Covert listening devices on the Crypto Museum website
 Eavesdropping Devices Found in Restaurant - QCC Global News Story
 Some CIA surveillance and bugging devices

Surveillance
Law enforcement equipment
Espionage devices
Espionage techniques